Paraptorthodius is a genus of glowworm beetles in the family Phengodidae. There are at least three described species in Paraptorthodius.

Species
These three species belong to the genus Paraptorthodius:
 Paraptorthodius mirabilis Schaeffer, 1904
 Paraptorthodius queretaroensis Zaragoza, 1999
 Paraptorthodius schaefferi Zaragoza, 1989

References

Further reading

 

Phengodidae
Bioluminescent insects
Articles created by Qbugbot